Parchin ( also Romanized as parchin; also known as parchin) is a village in Howmeh Rural District, in the Central District of Khodabandeh County, Zanjan Province, Iran. At the 2006 census, its population was 834, in 158 families.

References 

Populated places in Khodabandeh County